Larce is a village in the municipality of Želino, North Macedonia.

Demographics
As of the 2021 census, Larce had 1,850 residents with the following ethnic composition:
Albanians 1,804
Persons for whom data are taken from administrative sources 46

According to the 2002 census, the village had a total of 1,868 inhabitants. Ethnic groups in the village include:
Albanians 1,859
Macedonians 5
Bosniaks 1
Others 2

References

External links

Villages in Želino Municipality
Albanian communities in North Macedonia